The Mil Mi-26 (NATO reporting name: Halo) is a Soviet/Russian heavy transport helicopter.  Its product code is Izdeliye 90.  Operated by both military and civilian operators, it is the largest and most powerful helicopter to have gone into serial production.

Design and development
Following the incomplete development of the heavier Mil Mi-12 (prototypes known as Mil V-12) in the early 1970s, work began on a new heavy-lift helicopter, designated as the Izdeliye 90 ("Project 90") and later allocated designation Mi-26. The new design was required to have an empty weight less than half its maximum takeoff weight. The helicopter was designed by Marat Tishchenko, protégé of Mikhail Mil, founder of the OKB-329 design bureau.

The Mi-26 was designed to replace earlier Mi-6 and Mi-12 heavy lift helicopters and act as a heavy-lift helicopter for military and civil use, having twice the cabin space and payload of the Mi-6, then the world's largest and fastest production helicopter. The primary purpose of the Mi-26 was to transport military equipment such as  amphibious armored personnel carriers and mobile ballistic missiles to remote locations after delivery by military transport aircraft such as the Antonov An-22 or Ilyushin Il-76.

The first Mi-26 flew on 14 December 1977 and the first production aircraft was rolled out on 4 October 1980. Development was completed in 1983 and by 1985, the Mi-26 was in Soviet military and commercial service.

The Mi-26 was the first factory-equipped helicopter with a single, eight-blade main lift rotor. It is capable of flight in the event of power loss by one engine (depending on aircraft mission weight) because of an engine load sharing system. It is the second largest and heaviest helicopter ever constructed, after the experimental Mil V-12. The tail rotor has about the same diameter and thrust as the four-bladed main rotor fitted to the MD Helicopters MD 500.

The Mi-26's unique main gearbox is relatively light at  but can absorb , which was accomplished using a non-planetary, split-torque design with quill shafts for torque equalization.  The Mil Design Bureau designed the VR-26 transmission itself, due to Mil's normal gearbox supplier not being able to design such a gearbox. The gearbox housing is stamped aluminum. A split-torque design is also used in the  gearbox assembly on the American three-engine Sikorsky CH-53K King Stallion.

, the Mi-26 still holds the Fédération Aéronautique Internationale world record for the greatest mass lifted by a helicopter to  –  on a flight in 1982.

In July 2010 a proposed Russian-Chinese development of a 33-ton heavy-lift helicopter was announced. In early 2019, Russia's state corporation Rostec inked a landmark agreement on developing a 40-ton next-generation heavy helicopter.

Rostvertol, the Russian helicopter manufacturer, was contracted to refurbish and upgrade the entire fleet of Mi-26s serving in the Russian Air Force, estimated to be around 20 helicopters. The upgraded aircraft is comparable to a new variant, the Mi-26T. Contract completion was planned for 2015. The contract also covered the production of 22 new Mi-26T helicopters. Eight new-built helicopters were delivered to operational units by January 2012. Under the 2010 contract, 17 new-production helicopters were delivered by 2014. In all, Rostvertol delivered fourteen Mi-26s to domestic and foreign customers in the period 201214 and six helicopters in 2015. Deliveries to the Russian Air Force were continued in 2016, 2017 and 2019.

In 2016, Russia started development of PD-12V a variant of the Aviadvigatel PD-14 turbofan engine to power the Mi-26.

Operational history

Buran programme
The developers of the Buran space vehicle programme considered using Mi-26 helicopters to "bundle" lift components for the Buran spacecraft, but test flights with a mock-up showed this to be risky and impractical.

Chernobyl accident
The Mi-26S was a disaster response version hastily developed during the containment efforts of the Chernobyl nuclear accident in 1986. Thirty Mi-26 were used for radiation measurements and precision drops of insulating material to cover the damaged No.4 reactor. It was also equipped with a deactivating liquid tank and underbelly spraying apparatus. The Mi-26S was operated in immediate proximity to the nuclear reactor, with a filter system and protective screens mounted in the cabin to protect the crew during delivery of construction materials to the most highly contaminated areas.

Siberian Woolly Mammoth recovery
In October 1999, an Mi-26 was used to transport a 25-ton block of frozen soil encasing a preserved, 23,000-year-old woolly mammoth (Jarkov Mammoth) from the Siberian tundra to a lab in Khatanga, Taymyr. Due to the weight of the load, the Mi-26 had to be returned to the factory afterward to check for airframe and rotor warping caused by the potential of structural over-stressing.

Afghanistan Chinook recovery
In early 2002, a civilian Mi-26 was leased to recover two U.S. Army MH-47E Chinook helicopters from a mountain in Afghanistan. The Chinooks, operated by the 160th Special Operations Aviation Regiment, had been employed in Operation Anaconda, an effort to drive al Qaeda and Taliban fighters out of the Shahi-Kot Valley and surrounding mountains.

While the second craft was too badly damaged to recover, the first was determined to be repairable and estimated to weigh  with fuel, rotors, and non-essential equipment removed.

The Mi-26 was located through Skylink Aviation in Toronto, which had connections with a Russian company called Sportsflite that operated three civilian Mi-26 versions called "Heavycopters". One of the aircraft, aiding in construction and firefighting work in neighboring Tajikistan, was leased for $300,000; it lifted the Chinook, flew it to Kabul, then later to Bagram Air Base, Afghanistan to ship to Fort Campbell, Kentucky, U.S. for repairs.

Chechnya shoot down crash

On 19 August 2002, Chechen separatists hit an overloaded Mi-26 with a surface-to-air missile, causing it to crash-land in a minefield, killing 127 of the people on boardthe greatest loss of life in the history of helicopter aviation.

China, Wenchuan "quake lake" emergency
As a result of the magnitude 8.0 earthquake in Sichuan province of China on 12 May 2008, many rivers became blocked by landslides, resulting in the formation of so-called quake lakes: large amounts of water pooling up behind the landslide-formed dams. These dams eventually broke under the weight of the water, endangering those downstream. At least one Mi-26 belonging to a branch of China's civil aviation service was used to bring heavy earth moving tractors to the quake-lakes at Tangjiashan mountain, located in difficult terrain and accessible only by foot or air.

Afghanistan helicopter downing
In July 2009, a Moldovan Mi-26 was shot down in Helmand province with the loss of six Ukrainian crew members. The aircraft, belonging to Pecotox Air, was said to be on a humanitarian mission under NATO contract.

Indian Air Force Mi-26 crash
On 14 December 2010, an Indian Air Force Mi-26 crashed seconds after taking off from Jammu Airport, injuring all nine passengers. The Indian Institute of Flight Safety released an investigation report that stated improper fastening of the truck inside caused an imbalance of the helicopter and led to the crash. The Mi-26 had been carrying machines from Konkan Railway to Jammu–Baramulla line project.

Norwegian Air Force Sea King recovery
On 11 December 2012, a Westland Sea King from No. 330 Squadron RNoAF experienced undisclosed technical issues and made an emergency landing on Mount Divgagáisá. The landing caused parts of the landing gear to break. The Sea King was prepared by removing rotor blades and fuel before it was airlifted to Banak Air Station by a Russian Mil Mi-26 on 23December 2012.

2022 Russian invasion of Ukraine

During the 2022 Ukrainian Kharkiv counteroffensive, Russian Mi-26s helicopters were involved in transfer of reinforcements on the frontline, namely in the vicinity of towns Izium and Kupiansk.

Variants

V-29 Prototype version
Mi-26 Military cargo/freight transport version. NATO name: 'Halo-A'.
Mi-26A Upgraded military version with a new flight/navigation system. Flown in 1985 but no production.
Mi-26M Upgraded version of the Mi-26 with ZMKB Progress D-127 engines for better performance.
Mi-26S Disaster response version developed in response to nuclear accident at Chernobyl.
Mi-26T Basic civil cargo/freight transport version. Production from 1985.
Mi-26TS Civil cargo transport version, also marketed as Mi-26TC.
Mi-26TM Flying crane version with under-nose gondola for pilot/crane operator.
Mi-26TP Firefighting version with internal  fire retardant tank.
Mi-26MS Medical evacuation version of Mi-26T. Up to 60 stretcher cases in field ambulance role, or can be equipped for intensive care or as field hospital.
Mi-26P 63 seat passenger version.
Mi-26PK Flying crane derivative of Mi-26P.
Mi-26T2 Improved version of the Mi-26T equipped with BREO-26 airborne electronic system, allowing it to fly any time, day or night, under good and bad weather conditions. Serial production began on 22 May 2015.
Mi-26T2V Newest modernization variant intended for the Russian military, equipped with new NPK90-2V avionics suite allowing it to fly routes in automatic mode, airborne defense complex "Vitebsk", anti-blast seats and new navigation and satellite communication systems. The cockpit is fitted with multifunctional displays with provision for use of night-vision goggles during night ops. The Mi-26T2V made its maiden flight in August 2018.
Mi-27 Proposed airborne command post variant; two prototypes were built in 1988. This variant was built with foldable antennas for ground and air operations.

Operators

Military operators

Algerian Air Force

Royal Cambodian Air Force
Royal Cambodian Army 

People's Liberation Army Ground Force

Congolese Democratic Air Force

Equatorial Guinean Air Force

Royal Jordanian Air Force 

Indian Air Force                        

Kazakhstan Air Force

Mexican Air Force

North Korean Air Force 

Peruvian Army

Russian Air Force
Border Service of Russia 

Venezuelan Army

Civil operators

Skytech

China Flying Dragon Aviation

UTair Aviation

Former operators

Belarusian Air Force

Aeroflot
Soviet Air Force

Specifications (Mi-26)

See also

References
Citations

Bibliography

External links

 Mi-26 page on Russian Helicopters site 
 Mi-26 page on Mil helicopter site
 Mi-26 page on Aviation.ru
 Mi-26 page on fas.org
 Mi-26 walkaround at Monino Museum, Russia, Mi-26 walkaroundat VAZ Technical Museum, Russia, and Mi-26 walkaround at Kolomna, Russia on scalemodels.ru

Military transport helicopters
1970s Soviet military transport aircraft
Mil aircraft
1970s Soviet helicopters
Twin-turbine helicopters
Aircraft first flown in 1977